Henriette may refer to:

Princess Henriette of France
Henriette of Cleves
Henriette Willemina Crommelin (1870-1957), Dutch labor leader and temperance reformer
Henriette Dibon (1902–1989), French poet and short story writer.
Henriette Hansen (disambiguation)
Henriette Petit (1894-1983), Chilean painter
Henriette Sauret (1890-1976), French feminist, author, pacifist, journalist
Henriette Yvonne Stahl
Henriette, Minnesota
Hurricane Henriette (disambiguation)
 La fête à Henriette, a 1952 French film often known simply as Henriette
 Henriette Bimmelbahn, an anthropomorphized steam locomotive-hauled train in the eponymous German picture book by James Krüss

See also
 
 Henrietta (disambiguation)